Refractory cytopenia with multilineage dysplasia is a form of myelodysplastic syndrome.

It is abbreviated "RCMD".

References

External links 

Myeloid neoplasia